Duya may refer to:

Duya, Myanmar
Duya language